The Mthethwa Paramountcy, sometimes referred to as the Mtetwa or Mthethwa Empire, was a Southern African state that arose in the 18th century south of Delagoa Bay and inland in eastern southern Africa. "Mthethwa" means "the one who rules".

Background 
According to Muzi Mthethwa (1995), the Mthethwas are descended from the Nguni tribes of northern Natal and the Lubombo Mountains, whose modern identity dates back some 700 years. They are among the first Nguni-Tsonga groups who left the Great Lakes in Central Africa between 200 AD and 1200 AD. On arrival in Southern Africa, they settled around modern-day Swaziland, mainly on the Lubombo Mountains, before leaving in the 17th century to settle in modern-day KwaZulu-Natal, in the Nkandla region.

It consisted of roughly 30 Nguni chiefdoms, lineages, and clans. Unlike its successor, the Zulu Kingdom, the Mthethwa Paramountcy was a confederation. After Zulu chief Shaka kaSenzagakhona (better known as Shaka Zulu) became king, he forged a nearly homogeneous nation with a single king (nkosi).

The Mthethwa Paramountcy was consolidated and extended under the rule of Dingiswayo. The chief entered into an alliance with the Tsonga to the north in the early 19th century and began trading Ivory and other things with the Portuguese in Mozambique. About 1811, the Buthelezi and a number of other Nguni groups, including the then still marginal Zulu clan led by Senzangakona, were integrated into a sort of confederacy with the Mthethwa clan predominating.

Dingiswayo was killed in a battle with the Ndwandwe in 1817. The Mthethwa Paramountcy was then superseded by the Zulu Kingdom under Shaka, a former lieutenant in the Mthethwa army. Many military and administrative institutions, including the system of age regiments (amabutho) that later characterized the Zulu kingdom were utilized by Mthethwa, although an older theory that credits the Nyambose rulers of Mthethwa with the introduction of amabutho is no longer accepted because of evidence for the widespread existence of amabutho going back into the 18th century and perhaps earlier. The Mthethwa were amongst the first Nguni Chiefdoms to use guns.

See also
Mfecane
Zululand

References

, reprinted in 1998 by Da Capo Press, Cambridge, 

Mthethwa
Former monarchies of Africa
States and territories established in the 18th century
History of KwaZulu-Natal
Monarchies of South Africa
Former countries in Africa
States and territories disestablished in 1817